Life Is Just A Game is the debut studio album by Spanish DJ and producer DJ Sammy.  It was released on June 29, 1998.

Track listing

External links
 

1998 debut albums
DJ Sammy albums
Universal Records albums